Ethan Sandler (born December 3, 1972) is an American actor, film producer and writer known for his role of ADA Jeffrey Brandau on the television series Crossing Jordan.

Career

Sandler's screen credits include The Chocolate War, Flushed, and The Enigma with a Stigma. He can be heard in Disney's 2007 computer-animated film Meet the Robinsons as DOR-15 (Doris), Uncle Fritz, Aunt Petunia, Uncle Dimitri, Uncle Spike, Cousin Laszlo, CEO of InventCo. From 2002 to 2007 he was in Crossing Jordan as ADA Jeffrey Brandau.

Personal life
Sandler is Jewish and graduated from Northwestern University where he met his future wife, actress Kathryn Hahn. They have been married since 2002 and have two children together, Leonard and Mae. The family lives in Los Feliz, Los Angeles.

Filmography

Film

TV

Producer

References

External links
 

1972 births
Living people
American male film actors
American male television actors
20th-century American male actors
21st-century American male actors
Jewish American male actors
Jewish American writers
Male actors from Indiana
Actors from Fort Wayne, Indiana
21st-century American Jews
People from Los Feliz, Los Angeles